The Pipistrel Virus is a two-seat, single engine light aircraft, manufactured by Pipistrel in Slovenia and Italy, and sold as an ultralight, homebuilt kit, or light-sport aircraft.

Introduced in 1999, based on the design of the Pipistrel Sinus, the Virus has been produced in a number of variants with different engines, wingspans, and undercarriage configurations. It can be equipped with a full airframe emergency recovery parachute system.

Design and development
It is a high-wing, cantilever monoplane of pod-and-boom configuration with a T-tail and air brakes. The cabin has two seats side-by-side. Its fixed undercarriage can be provided in either tricycle or tailwheel configuration.  It is available in long wing version (12.5-metre wingspan), powered by an  Rotax 912 engine, or in short wing "SW" version (10.7-metre wingspan), equipped with several options of Rotax 912 and 914 engines.

The Virus SW 121 and Explorer (SW 121A) line of aircraft are rated for intentional spins.

The aviation journalist Paul Bertorelli has criticized the aircraft's design for lack of cabin occupant crashworthiness. However, the manufacturer points out that this kind of issue is typical of aircraft in the LSA category. The design has no history of head trauma during the accidents that have occurred.

By February 2014 Pipistrel had produced more than 600 Sinus/Virus aircraft. Production had reached 1000 aircraft by March 2019.

In April 2016 the Virus SW 121 received an EASA Full Type Certificate. The SW 121 is powered by a Rotax 912 S3 and is designed to meet EASA requirements for a Light Sports Aeroplane. It is the first EASA type-certified (no restrictions, category "normal") aircraft in CS-LSA category for Night VFR operations, Intentional spins and glider-towing. It features an autopilot, dual redundant ADAHRS units and airbrakes.

In January 2022, Pipistel announced a new variant of the SW 121, commercially referred to as Explorer. The new variant, also EASA type-certified, features new touch-screen avionics and a haptic stall warning system, among other equipment.

Operational history

The Pipistrel Virus flew for the first time on August 10, 1999. Production began on January 20, 2000.

The development of the short wing version started in 2007. The Virus SW production started in 2008.

The Virus won the NASA 2007 Personal Air Vehicle (PAV) Challenge and the 2008 General Aviation Technology (GAT) Challenge.

On 8 January 2012, Slovenian pilot Matevž Lenarčič launched an around-the-world flight attempt from Slovenia in a turbocharged Virus SW914, sponsored as the GreenLight World Flight. He completed the flight on 19 April 2012, returning to Slovenia claiming to be the first person to complete such a flight without a copilot and having flown  during the journey.

On 12 October 2015 Pipistrel won an international tender, issued by the Indian Ministry of Defence, to supply 194 light trainers to the Indian Air Force (72 aircraft), Indian Navy (12 aircraft) and National Cadet Corps (110 aircraft). The two-seat Pipistrel Virus SW 80 aircraft, known as the Garud after a bird in Hindu mythology, will be used for training of Flight Safety and Air Wing Cadets. By September 2019, all 194 aircraft had been delivered.

Variants 
Virus 912
Initial version with  wingspan and powered by an  Rotax 912 UL engine.
Virus SW 80
Short wing version with  wingspan.
Virus SW 80 Garud
Special variant of the SW 80 developed for the Indian Ministry of Defence in 2015. 194 units were manufactured and delivered by September 2019.
Virus SW 100
Short wing version equipped with a more powerful  Rotax 912 ULS engine.
Virus SW 100 iS
Short wing version equipped with a  Rotax 912 iS engine with direct fuel injection and an electronic engine management unit. Fuel consumption is reduced by 13% and range is increased by 18% with respect to the SW 100.
Virus SW 115 (SW 914 Turbo)
Short wing version equipped with a  Rotax 914 UL turbocharged engine.
Virus SW 121
EASA type-certified model in the CS-LSA category. Short wing version powered by a  Rotax 912 S3 engine.
Virus SW 600 D
Based on the SW 121 but featuring a  Rotax 912 ULS engine, it is the first aircraft to be certified under the new German LTF-UL2019 rules for the 600 kg microlight category.
 Velis Electro (Virus SW 128)
 First electric aircraft to secure certification, from the EASA on 10 June 2020. Powered by a 76 hp (58 kW) electric engine developed with Emrax, it offers a payload of 170 kg, a cruise speed of 90 kn (170 km/h), and a 50 min endurance. Pipistrel plans to deliver over 30 examples in 2020, to be operated as a trainer aircraft. It has two liquid-cooled, 11 kWh, 345 V lithium-ion batteries.
Explorer (Virus SW 121A)
Variant of the EASA type-certified SW 121 with touch-screen avionics and a haptic stall warning system.

Operators

Civil
The different versions of the Virus are flown by private individuals and flight schools worldwide.

Military

Indian Air Force – 72 × SW 80 Garud
Indian Navy – 12 × SW 80 Garud
National Cadet Corps – 110 × SW 80 Garud

Slovenian Air Force and Air Defence – 5 × Velis Electro

Royal Danish Air Force - 2 x Velis Electro

Specifications (Virus 912 SW 100)

See also

References

External links

1990s Slovenian sport aircraft
Pipistrel aircraft
Single-engined tractor aircraft
High-wing aircraft
Aircraft first flown in 1999
Glider tugs